City Life may refer to:
 Urban culture, the culture of cities
 CityLife (Milan), a 2004 urban project in Milan
 City Life (The Blackbyrds album), 1975
 City Life (Boogie Boys album), 1985
 City Life (magazine), a Manchester-based listings magazine
 City Life (music), a 1994 musical composition by Steve Reich
 City Life (TV series), a New Zealand soap opera
 City Life (video game), a 2006 city building video game developed by Monte Cristo

See also
Country Life (disambiguation)